Señorita República Dominicana 1964 was held on January 31, 1964. 12 candidates are competed for the national crown. The winner represented the Dominican Republic at the Miss Universe 1964 . The first runner up will enter Miss International 1964. Only the 16 province entered. On the top 6 they showed their swimsuit and answered questions so they could go to the top 3. In the top 3 they would answer more questions. There are only 12 delegates due to the reason low economy in each province and the country.

Results

Señorita República Dominicana 1964 : Clara Edilia Chapuseaux Soñé (San Rafael)
1st Runner Up : Mildred Almonte (Valverde)
2nd Runner Up : Georgia Garrido (Puerto Plata)

Top 6

Eva Ferro (Isla Catalina)
Ingrid Balboa (Santiago)
Lorena Valle (Distrito Nacional)

Special awards
 Miss Rostro Bello - Catalina Areva (La Vega)
 Miss Photogenic (voted by press reporters) - Georgia Garrido (Puerto Plata)
 Miss Congeniality (voted by Miss Dominican Republic Universe contestants) - Margara Espinal (Santiago Rodríguez)

Delegates

 Azua - Rosa Ceneyda de la Rosa Montas
 Distrito Nacional - Lorena Carolina Valle Canoa
 Espaillat - Ana Gabriela Mota Reyes
 Isla Catalina - Eva María Ferro Rodríguez
 La Vega - Catalina Aresminda Areva Ovao
 Puerto Plata - Georgia de Dolores Garrido Rosario
 Samaná - Fernanda Malisa de Castro Williams
 San Rafael - Clara Edilia Chapuseaux Soñé
 Santiago - Ingrid Maroa Balboa Cameron
 Santiago Rodríguez - Margara Carolina Espinal Espinal
 Séibo - Altagracia Reyna Hidalgo Wines
 Valverde - Mildred Farina Almonte Rouas

Trivia

Miss Isla Catalina is the youngest sister Miss Colón from Miss Dominican Republic 1956.

Miss Dominican Republic
1964 beauty pageants
1964 in the Dominican Republic